Putzeysia wiseri is a species of sea snail, a marine gastropod mollusk in the family Eucyclidae.

Description
The height of the shell attains 5 mm. The small shell has a subconic shape. It contains 6–7 more or less convex whorls. These are latticed by transverse cinguli (6 on penultimate whorl), and longitudinal elevated, oblique lines. The aperture is suborbicular. The outer lip is sulcate within.

Distribution
This species is distributed in the Mediterranean Sea (found off the Gulf of Bona, Algiers) and in the Bay of Biscay.

References

 Gofas, S.; Le Renard, J.; Bouchet, P. (2001). Mollusca, in: Costello, M.J. et al. (Ed.) (2001). European register of marine species: a check-list of the marine species in Europe and a bibliography of guides to their identification. Collection Patrimoines Naturels, 50: pp. 180–213

External links

 wiseri
Gastropods described in 1842